Claudio Gioè (born 27 January 1975 in Palermo, Italy) is an Italian actor of the cinema, theatre and television.

Career
Gioè made his acting debut in the 1997 film "Qui" and has since performed in many other films such as "I cento passi" ("One Hundred Steps", about the life of Peppino Impastato), "La meglio gioventù" ("The Best of Youth"), "Operazione Odissea" and "La matassa". Gioè, however, is best known to Italian viewers for his portrayal of Mafia boss Salvatore Riina in the 2007 television miniseries  "Il Capo dei Capi" ("Boss of Bosses"). It was aired by Canale 5 in six parts.

In 2009 Gioè had a starring role in another Mafia-related television miniseries, "Squadra antimafia- Palermo oggi", as vicequestore Ivan Di Meo. One of his co-stars is actress Simona Cavallari. In 2010, he starred in the sequel "Squadra antimafia - Palermo oggi 2".

Gioè starred as a young priest with psychic powers in the popular Canale 5 miniseries Il tredicesimo apostolo which was aired in January and February 2012.

Filmography

Films 
 The protagonists (1999)
 I cento passi (2000)
St. Francis (2002)
 Mundo civilizado (2003)
 Passato prossimo (2003)
 La meglio gioventù (2003)
 Stai con me (2004)
 ...e se domani (2005)
 Piano, solo (2007)
 La straniera (2009)
 La matassa, (2009)
 Henry (2010)
 Boris - Il film (2010)
 The Mafia Kills Only in Summer (2013)
 Latin Lover (2015)
  Sotto copertura
(2015-2017)
 Mom or Dad? (2017)

TV series 
 Il Capo dei Capi (2007)
 Squadra antimafia - Palermo oggi (2009-2010)
 Il tredicesimo apostolo (2012-2014)
 The Mafia Kills Only in Summer (2016)

References

External links 

Living people
1975 births
Male actors from Palermo
Accademia Nazionale di Arte Drammatica Silvio D'Amico alumni